Connecticut Street Armory, also known as the 74th Regimental Armory, is a historic National Guard armory building located at Buffalo in Erie County, New York.  It is sited at Columbus Park. It is a massive castle-like structure built in 1899 of Medina sandstone. It was designed by architect Isaac G. Perry. It consists of a -story administration building with an attached 2-story drill shed all constructed of sandstone, lying on a rusticated battered stone foundation.  The building features 4- to 6-story towers surrounding the administration building, and a -story square tower at the center entrance.  It is home to the 74th Regiment of the New York National Guard. Prior to its construction, the site was home to a 13.5 million gallon reservoir.

It was listed on the National Register of Historic Places in 1995.

Gallery

References

External links
Connecticut Street Armory, Buffalo as an Architectural Museum
Connecticut Street Armory - U.S. National Register of Historic Places on Waymarking.com

Armories in New York (state)
Armories on the National Register of Historic Places in New York (state)
Government buildings completed in 1899
Buildings and structures in Buffalo, New York
1899 establishments in New York (state)
National Register of Historic Places in Buffalo, New York